The Warfield Lectures are named in honor of Annie Kinkead Warfield, wife of Benjamin Breckinridge Warfield professor of theology at the Princeton Theological Seminary from 1887 to 1921.

Where lectures have been published the book titles are below.

Lecturers

 1961 – 
 1962 – Karl Barth
 1964 – Hendrikus Berkhof
 1965 – John McIntyre
 1970 – John E. Smith
 1973 – Paul Ricoeur
 1978 – George S. Hendry
 1979 – Jürgen Moltmann "The Trinity and the Kingdom: The Doctrine of God" (portions)
 1981 – Thomas F. Torrance "The Mediation of Christ"
 1982 – Hugh T. Kerr
 1983 – Jane Dempsey Douglass Women, Freedom, and Calvin 
 1984 – Lesslie Newbigin
 1986 – Letty M. Russell
 1989 – John W. de Gruchy Liberating Reformed Theology (1991)  
 1991 – Michael Welker   Creation and Reality  
  – Colin Gunton A Brief Theology of Revelation
 1994 – B. A. Gerrish
 1995 – Shirley Guthrie
 1996 – Christina Baxter
 1997 – Karlfried Froehlich
 2000 – 
 2001 – J. B. Torrance
 2002 – James M. Gustafson
 2003 – John Polkinghorne
 2004 – 
 2005 – Marilyn McCord Adams
 2007 – Kathryn Tanner "Christ the Key"
 2009 – David Fergusson
 2009 – Randall C. Zachman
 2011 – David Kelsey
 2012 – Cornelius Plantinga
 2013 – Jennifer Herdt
 2014 – 
 2015 – Sarah Coakley
 2016 – J. Kameron Carter
 2018 – 
 2022 – 

Christian theological lectures
Princeton Theological Seminary